Royal Bank Plaza is a skyscraper in Toronto, Ontario, Canada that serves as the "corporate headquarters" for the Royal Bank of Canada. The building shares with the Fairmont Royal York Hotel the block in Toronto's financial district bordered by Bay, Front, York, and Wellington streets. It is owned by Pontegadea.

History
The building was built to be the new main office of the Royal Bank after its decision to move its centre of operations from Place Ville Marie in Montreal to Toronto in the late 1970s, although Place Ville Marie formally remained the "head office" of the bank. Royal Bank Plaza consists of a South Tower and a North Tower. The structures each have a triangular footprint and sit on opposing corners of the square site. The exteriors of the structures are largely covered with gold-bronze glass with tan granite accents. Together, both towers contain more than 14,000 windows which project from the facade to form angular bays set into brushed aluminum frames. Due to these angled-bays, the buildings are home to many spiders that have built webs on the outside of Royal Bank Plaza. Six bays are grouped between piers which are covered in the same glass. The upper stories are recessed and contain three larger angled-bays between the piers. The double-height entry is also recessed from the facade and covered in dark-tinted glass set into dark aluminum frames. The glass for the body of the building was manufactured by Canadian Pittsburgh Industries and was coloured using  of gold, valued at CA$70 per pane at the time of installation.

In addition to office space and the Toronto Main Branch of the Royal Bank, Royal Bank Plaza also contains a shopping concourse which is part of the PATH network, linking directly to the TD Centre as well as Union Station, Brookfield Place (BCE Place) and the Fairmont Royal York. The concourse merchants mall and tower lobbies underwent extensive renovations between 2005 and 2007.

The building was constructed with a large atrium above the main banking hall that linked the two towers, but in the 1990s a trading floor was added, closing the open space.

The bank maintains a presence in a number of other towers in the downtown core, including the Royal Bank Building at 20 King Street West adjacent to Scotia Plaza, the RBC Centre at 155 Wellington Street West, and the building complex at 310, 315, 320 and 330 Front Street West, next to the Metro Toronto Convention Centre, which is also owned by Oxford.

Notable tenants
Royal Bank of Canada
Vale S.A. 
JPMorgan Chase 
MUFG
Interac Corporation

Gallery

See also
List of tallest buildings in Toronto
List of tallest buildings in Canada

References

External links

Royal Bank Plaza North at Oxford Properties Group
Royal Bank Plaza South at Oxford Properties Group

Office buildings completed in 1976
Office buildings completed in 1979
Bank headquarters in Canada
Modernist architecture in Canada
PATH (Toronto)
Royal Bank of Canada
JPMorgan Chase buildings
Skyscrapers in Toronto
Twin towers
Oxford Properties
WZMH Architects buildings
1976 establishments in Ontario
Skyscraper office buildings in Canada